
Greek name Anna Maria is a feminine given name. In English the name Anna Maria is Annmarie.

Notable people with the name include:

People

 Anna Maria Alberghetti, Italian operatic singer and actress
 Anna Maria Arduino (1663–1700), 17th century writer and painter, the Princess of Piombino from Messina, Sicily.
 Anna Maria Bietti Sestieri, Italian archaeologist 
 Anna-Maria Botsari, Greek chess player
 Anna Maria Crouch, British singer and actress
 Ana María de Huarte y Muñiz, Empress consort, wife of Agustin I of Mexico
 Anna Maria Ehrenstrahl, Swedish painter
 Anna-Maria Fernandez, American tennis player
 Anna Maria Ferrero, Italian actress
 Anna Maria Fox, English philanthropist
 Anna-Maria Gradante, German judoka
 Anna Maria Groot, Dutch model and Miss Europe winner
 Anna Maria Guarnieri, Italian actress
 Anna Maria Hall, Irish novelist
 Anna Maria Horsford, American film actress
 Anna Maria Hussey, British mycologist, writer, and illustrator
 Anna Maria Indrio, Italian-Danish architect
 Anna Maria Jopek, Polish musician and singer
 Anna Maria Klechniowska, Polish music educator and composer
 Anna Maria Komorowska, Polish noblewoman 
 Anna Maria Lenngren, Swedish writer
 Anna Maria Lenngren, Swedish author
 Anna Maria Luisa de' Medici, Italian noblewoman 
 Anna Maria Mozzoni, Italian political activist
 Anna Maria Muccioli, Sammarinese politician 
 Anna Maria Mühe, German actress
Anna María Nápoles, American behavioral epidemiologist and science administrator
 Anna Maria Nilsson, Swedish biathlete
 Anna Maria of Anhalt, German noblewoman 
 Anna Maria of Hesse-Kassel, German princess
 Anna Maria of Hungary, Empress of Bulgaria
 Anna Maria of Hungary, Hungarian princess
 Anna Maria of Mecklenburg-Schwerin, German noblewoman 
 Anna-Maria Gradante, German judoka
 Anna Maria of Ostfriesland, German noblewoman 
 Anna Maria Ortese, Italian short story writer and poet
 Anna Maria Perez de Taglé, American actress and singer
 Anna Maria Picarelli, Italian footballer
 Anna Maria Porter, English poet and novelist
 Anna Maria Priestman (1828-1914), British social reformer and women's rights activist
 Anna Maria Rizzoli, Italian actress
 Anna Maria Rückerschöld, Swedish author
 Anna Maria Sandri, Italian actress
 Anna Maria Schwegelin, German alleged witch
 Anna Maria Strada, Italian soprano 
 Anna Maria Taigi, Italian beatified woman
 Anna Maria Tarantola, Italian manager
 Anna Maria Tatò, Italian film director
 Anna Maria Thelott, Swedish artist
 Anna Maria Toso, Italian paralympic athlete
 Anna Maria Tremonti, Canadian  journalist
 Anna Maria van Schurman, Dutch artist, poet and scholar
 Anna Maria Wells, American poet and writer
 Anna-Maria Müller, German luger 
 Anna Russell, Duchess of Bedford, birth name Anna Maria Stanhope
 Princess Anna Maria of Sweden, Swedish princess
 Queen Anna Maria, wife of Constantine II, king of Greece

Fictional
 Anna Maria, a fictional rat in The Tale of Samuel Whiskers or The Roly-Poly Pudding

See also
 Annamaria

Feminine given names